Illinois Route 71 is a  southwest-to-northeast state highway in north central Illinois. It runs from the end of Interstate 180 in Hennepin to U.S. Route 34 in Oswego.

Route description 

Outside of Hennepin, the road stretches east to an intersection with Interstate 39 near Oglesby, paralleling I-39 to the north for several miles on a concurrency with Illinois Route 351 before turning eastward again near LaSalle-Peru. 

Between LaSalle-Peru and Ottawa, Route 71 parallels the south bank of the Illinois River and passes Starved Rock State Park. It then crosses the Illinois River on a simple four-lane girder bridge. It overlaps Illinois Route 23 through downtown Ottawa and U.S. Route 6 east from Route 23 before intersecting with Interstate 80. From here it continues to the northeast, passing through Norway, Newark, and Yorkville. Its eastern terminus is near downtown Oswego at an intersection with U.S. Highway 34 and Wolf's Crossing Road.

The now-defunct Prairie Parkway project, a limited-access highway, would have had an interchange with Route 71 southwest of High Point Road near Yorkville.

The stretch between US 34 and Orchard Road in Oswego was widened to four lanes in each direction, with the addition of center turn lane, in which the project was completed in the fall of 2015. There are also current plans to build a silica sand mine off of IL 71 near Starved Rock State Park, pending final approval by the City of Ottawa.  The plan is currently opposed by environmental groups due to the intended use of the sand in fracking practices and the potential damage caused by airborne dust and blasting operations.

History 
Before 1938, Illinois Route 71 originally connected from US 51 (now IL 251) at Twelvemile Corner to US 30 at Aurora. In 1938, IL 71 moved onto a new route as US 30 was rerouted through Twelvemile Corner. It traveled from IL 29 near Bureau Junction to IL 23 at Ottawa. Before that, it was part of Illinois Route 89 as well as Illinois Route 7A, and Illinois Route 89A. In 1939, a ferry that crossed the Illinois River was replaced by a truss bridge. In 1942, IL 71 was extended towards US 34 in Oswego. In 1947, the road between Norway and Yorkville was finished and then opened to traffic. In 1969, IL 71 was truncated from Bureau Junction to Hennepin after IL 26 was extended to Peoria.

Points of interest 
Just south of Norway, there is a memorial dedicated to Norwegian immigrants who settled in the area, with a small park, a cemetery, and a plaque from King Olav V. This memorial commemorates the Fox River Settlement. Dating from 1834, this was the location of the first permanent Norwegian-American immigrant settlement in the Midwest.

Near E. 26th Road, south of Norway, Illinois, there is also a crashed airplane that serves as a "memorial" of sorts to commemorate the 1980s agricultural crash, which affected the rural farming county.

Major intersections

References

External links

071
Transportation in Putnam County, Illinois
Transportation in LaSalle County, Illinois
Transportation in Kendall County, Illinois